John "Ellis" Edwards (May 17, 1922 – June 3, 1979) was an American aviator who served with the Tuskegee Airmen during World War II. He served in the 332nd Fighter Group and earned the Distinguished Flying Cross award. He also served as a pilot in the Korean War.

Early life and education
Edward and Willie Edwards were his parents. He had a brother (Jerome) and sister (Gwendolyn). His parents moved to Steubenville, Ohio and he and his siblings attended Steubenville High School.

After high school graduation he and his brother Jerome both attended West Virginia State College. The college became one of the first black colleges to enroll pilots in a Pilot Training Program and both brothers enrolled in the program. Both brothers became Tuskegee Airmen after completing training in Tuskegee. His brother Jerome was killed in a training exercise May 7, 1943 when his P-40 suffered a catastrophic failure upon takeoff. His brother's death was the first for the 332nd Fighter Group.

Military service

Upon completing his training at Tuskegee, Edwards was commissioned as a 2nd Lieutenant on April 8, 1944. He was assigned to the 99th Fighter Squadron, 332nd Fighter Group. In 1945 he was sent to Italy and assigned to Ramitelli Air Force Base where he and other Tuskegee pilots escorted allied planes on bombing runs. On April 1, 1945 he was acting as squadron section leader, when he shot down two ME-109’s on an escort mission. Edwards was awarded Distinguished flying Cross. 

Shortly after he was discharged the Korean War began, and he joined the Air Force, serving in the 332nd Fighter Group and flew many combat missions in the F86 Sabre. He held the rank of lieutenant colonel.  

After the Korean War he moved to Washington, D.C., and later he moved to Los Angeles, California.

Awards
Distinguished Flying Cross
Air Medal
Presidential Unit Citation
Congressional Gold Medal awarded to the Tuskegee Airmen in 2006
Edwards hometown, Steubenville, OH is known as the "City of Murals". There is a mural (located along Washington Street in Steubenville) dedicated to him and his brother Jerome. He and his brother also have their names engraved in the Tuskegee Airmen Memorial located in Sewickley Cemetery in Sewickley, Pennsylvania.

See also
 Executive Order 9981
 List of Tuskegee Airmen
 Military history of African Americans

Further reading
The Tuskegee Airmen: An Illustrated History, 1939–1949
"Born to Fly the Skies." Weirton Daily Times (Weirton, W.Va.) 23 February 2013. Web. 17 January 2014.
"Tuskegee Airmen Pilot Listing." Tuskegee University, 2014, Web. 17 January 2014.

References

Notes

External links
 Tuskegee Airmen at Tuskegee University
 Tuskegee Airmen Archives at the University of California, Riverside Libraries.
 Tuskegee Airmen, Inc.
 Tuskegee Airmen National Historic Site (U.S. National Park Service) 
 Tuskegee Airmen National Museum
 Fly (2009 play about the 332d Fighter Group)

1922 births
1979 deaths
United States Army Air Forces pilots of World War II
Tuskegee Airmen
Congressional Gold Medal recipients
United States Air Force personnel of the Korean War
American Korean War pilots